Lobata is an unincorporated community in Mingo County, West Virginia, United States. Lobata had a post office, which closed on July 1, 1989.

References

Unincorporated communities in Mingo County, West Virginia
Unincorporated communities in West Virginia
Coal towns in West Virginia